Montell is a given name and surname. Notable people with the name include:

Given name
 Montell Douglas (born 1986), British sprinter and former British record holder for the 100 metres
 Montell Griffin (born 1970), American boxer
 Montell Jordan (born 1968), American R&B singer-songwriter and record producer
 Montell Owens (born 1984), American football fullback for the Jacksonville Jaguars of the National Football League

Surname
 Donny Montell (born 1987), Lithuanian singer-songwriter
 Denise Montell, American biologist
 Victor Montell (1886–1967), Danish stage and film actor

See also
 Montel, given name and surname
 Montrell, given name and surname